Mohammad Basil Altaie (born March 5, 1952) is an Iraqi physicist, philosopher and professor of theoretical physics at Yarmouk University in Jordan.

Biography
Muhammad Basil Altaie was born on March 5, 1952, in Mosul, Iraq, where he completed his primary and secondary education. He enrolled in Mosul University in 1970, where he chose to study physics, a subject he had been interested in since high school. Following his graduation from the University of Mosul in June 1974, he was awarded a scholarship to pursue a doctorate in theoretical physics by the Iraqi government. He enrolled in the University of Manchester in the United Kingdom the same year, where he received his Ph.D. in theoretical physics in 1978.

After returning to his country, Iraq, Altae worked at the University of Mosul, where he remained until 1999. Since 1999, he has worked as an assistant professor of physics at Yarmouk University in Jordan, where he was promoted to the rank of professor in 2003. He has been identified as a member of a "new generation of authors" interested in the debate over Islam and science, with Mehdi Golshani, Bruno Guiderdoni, and Nidhal Guessoum, who, as natural scientists, seek a theistic interpretation of science based on Islamic concepts.

Views
Altaie argues that quantum indeterminacy provides credibility to Islamic theism. The universe, according to Altaie, is both extremely predictable and indeterministic. It is predictable, which is why "laws of nature" exist, yet it is indeterministic, indicating that these laws are not absolute. The order of nature, he believes, is an evidence of Divine wisdom, and its unpredictability, he believes, is a symbol of continuous creation.

Works
 The Divine Word and The Grand Design: Interpreting the Qur'an in the Light of Modern Science (2019)
 God, Nature, and the Cause: Essays on Islam and Science (2016)

References

Sources

Further reading
 

Iraqi physicists
Academic staff of Yarmouk University
Alumni of the University of Manchester
1952 births
Living people